In proof theory, a structural rule is an inference rule that does not refer to any logical connective, but instead operates on the judgment or sequents directly. Structural rules often mimic intended meta-theoretic properties of the logic. Logics that deny one or more of the structural rules are classified as substructural logics.

Common structural rules
Three common structural rules are:

 Weakening, where the hypotheses or conclusion of a sequent may be extended with additional members.

 Contraction, where two equal (or unifiable) members on the same side of a sequent may be replaced by a single member (or common instance). Also known as factoring in automated theorem proving systems using resolution. Known as idempotency of entailment in classical logic.
 Exchange, where two members on the same side of a sequent may be swapped. (This is also known as the permutation rule.)

A logic without any of the above structural rules would interpret the sides of a sequent as pure sequences; with exchange, they are multisets; and with both contraction and exchange they are sets.

These are not the only possible structural rules. A famous structural rule is known as cut. Considerable effort is spent by proof theorists in showing that cut rules are superfluous in various logics. More precisely, what is shown is that cut is only (in a sense) a tool for abbreviating proofs, and does not add to the theorems that can be proved. The successful 'removal' of cut rules, known as cut elimination, is directly related to the philosophy of computation as normalization (see Curry–Howard correspondence); it often gives a good indication of the complexity of deciding a given logic.

See also

Proof theory
Rules of inference